The 2020 International North West 200 is a motorcycle road racing event which was originally scheduled to take place between 10–16 May 2020 at the circuit, known as "The Triangle", based around the towns of Portstewart, Coleraine and Portrush, in Northern Ireland.

On 17 March the organisers postponed the event due to the COVID-19 pandemic in Northern Ireland with a view to looking at a new date during the 2020 racing calendar. The meeting was cancelled on 11 May 2020.

See also
North West 200 - History and results from the event

References

External links
The Official Website of the Kennedy International North West 200 The Official North 200 Website
Motorbikes - BBC Sport BBC North West 200 Website

2020
2020 in British motorsport
Sport in County Londonderry
Sport in County Antrim
2020 in Northern Ireland sport
Coleraine
2020 in motorcycle sport
May 2020 sports events in the United Kingdom
North West 200 Races